Melanthia is a genus of moths in the family Geometridae erected by Philogène Auguste Joseph Duponchel in 1829.

Species
 Melanthia alaudaria (Freyer, 1846)
 Melanthia procellata (Denis & Schiffermüller, 1775) – pretty chalk carpet

References

Melanthiini